The Tariff Act of 1930 (codified at ), commonly known as the Smoot–Hawley Tariff or Hawley–Smoot Tariff, was a law that implemented protectionist trade policies in the United States. Sponsored by Senator Reed Smoot and Representative Willis C. Hawley, it was signed by President Herbert Hoover on June 17, 1930. The act raised US tariffs on over 20,000 imported goods.

The tariffs under the act, excluding duty-free imports (see Tariff levels below), were the second highest in United States history, exceeded by only the Tariff of 1828. The Act prompted retaliatory tariffs by affected states against the United States. The Act and tariffs imposed by America's trading partners in retaliation were major factors of the reduction of American exports and imports by 67% during the Depression. Economists and economic historians have a consensus view that the passage of the Smoot–Hawley Tariff worsened the effects of the Great Depression.

Sponsors and legislative history

In 1922, Congress passed the Fordney–McCumber Tariff Act, which increased tariffs on imports.

The League of Nations' World Economic Conference met at Geneva in 1927, concluding in its final report: "the time has come to put an end to tariffs, and to move in the opposite direction." Vast debts and reparations could be repaid only through gold, services, or goods, but the only items available on that scale were goods. However, many of the delegates' governments did the opposite; in 1928, France was the first by passing a new tariff law and quota system.

By the late 1920s, the US economy had made exceptional gains in productivity because of electrification, which was a critical factor in mass production. Another contributing factor to economic growth was motorcars, trucks, and tractors replacing horses and mules. One sixth to one quarter of farmland, which had been devoted to feeding horses and mules, was freed up, contributing to a surplus in farm produce. Although nominal and real wages had increased, they did not keep up with the productivity gains. As a result, the ability to produce exceeded market demand, a condition that was variously termed overproduction and underconsumption.

Senator Smoot contended that raising the tariff on imports would alleviate the overproduction problem, but the United States had actually been running a trade account surplus, and although manufactured goods imports were rising, manufactured exports were rising even faster. Food exports had been falling and were in trade account deficit, but the value of food imports were a little over half of the value of manufactured imports.

As the global economy entered the first stages of the Great Depression in late 1929, the main goal of the US was to protect its jobs and farmers from foreign competition. Smoot championed another tariff increase within the United States in 1929, which became the Smoot–Hawley Tariff Bill. In his memoirs, Smoot made it abundantly clear:The world is paying for its ruthless destruction of life and property in the World War and for its failure to adjust purchasing power to productive capacity during the industrial revolution of the decade following the war.

Smoot was a Republican from Utah and chairman of the Senate Finance Committee. Willis C. Hawley, a Republican from Oregon, was chairman of the House Ways and Means Committee.

During the 1928 presidential election, one of Herbert Hoover's promises was to help beleaguered farmers by increasing tariffs on agricultural products. Hoover won, and Republicans maintained comfortable majorities in the House and the Senate during 1928. Hoover then asked Congress for an increase of tariff rates for agricultural goods and a decrease of rates for industrial goods.

The House passed a version of the act in May 1929, increasing tariffs on agricultural and industrial goods alike. The House bill passed on a vote of 264 to 147, with 244 Republicans and 20 Democrats voting in favor of the bill. The Senate debated its bill until March 1930, with many members trading votes based on their states' industries. The Senate bill passed on a vote of 44 to 42, with 39 Republicans and 5 Democrats voting in favor of the bill. The conference committee then unified the two versions, largely by raising tariffs to the higher levels passed by the House. The House passed the conference bill on a vote of 222 to 153, with the support of 208 Republicans and 14 Democrats.

Opponents
In May 1930, a petition was signed by 1,028 economists in the United States asking President Hoover to veto the legislation, organized by Paul Douglas, Irving Fisher, James T.F.G. Wood, Frank Graham, Ernest Patterson, Henry Seager, Frank Taussig, and Clair Wilcox. Automobile executive Henry Ford also spent an evening at the White House trying to convince Hoover to veto the bill, calling it "an economic stupidity", while J. P. Morgan's Chief Executive Thomas W. Lamont said he "almost went down on [his] knees to beg Herbert Hoover to veto the asinine Hawley–Smoot tariff".

While Hoover joined the economists in opposing the bill, calling it "vicious, extortionate, and obnoxious" because he felt it would undermine the commitment he had pledged to international cooperation, he eventually signed the bill after he yielded to influence from his own party, his Cabinet (who had threatened to resign), and business leaders.

In retaliation, Canada and other countries raised their own tariffs on American goods after the bill had become law.

Franklin D. Roosevelt spoke against the act during his campaign for President in 1932.

Retaliation
Most of the decline in trade was due to a plunge in GDP in the US and worldwide. However beyond that was additional decline. Some countries protested and others also retaliated with trade restrictions and tariffs. American exports to the protesters fell 18% and exports to those who retaliated fell 31%.

Threats of retaliation by other countries began long before the bill was enacted into law in June 1930. As the House of Representatives passed it in May 1929, boycotts broke out, and foreign governments moved to increase rates against American products, although rates could be increased or decreased by the Senate or by the conference committee. By September 1929, Hoover's administration had received protest notes from 23 trading partners, but the threats of retaliatory actions were ignored.

In May 1930, Canada, the country's most loyal trading partner, retaliated by imposing new tariffs on 16 products that accounted altogether for around 30% of US exports to Canada. Canada later also forged closer economic links with the British Empire via the British Empire Economic Conference of 1932, while France and Britain protested and developed new trade partners, and Germany developed a system of trade via clearing.

The depression worsened for workers and farmers despite Smoot and Hawley's promises of prosperity from high tariffs; consequently, Hawley lost re-nomination, while Smoot was one of 12 Republican Senators who lost their seats in the 1932 elections, with the swing being the largest in Senate history (being equalled in 1958 and 1980).

Tariff levels

In the two-volume series published by the US Bureau of the Census, "The Historical Statistics of the United States, Colonial Times to 1970, Bicentennial Edition", tariff rates have been represented in two forms. The dutiable tariff rate peak of 1932 was 59.1%, second only to the 61.7% rate of 1830.

However, 63% of all imports in 1933 were not taxed, which the dutiable tariff rate does not reflect. The free and dutiable rate in 1929 was 13.5%, and peaked under Smoot–Hawley in 1933 at 19.8%, one-third below the average 29.7% "free and dutiable rate" in the United States from 1821 to 1900.

The average tariff rate on dutiable imports increased from 40.1% in 1929 to 59.1% in 1932 (+19%). However, it had already been consistently at high levels between 1865 and 1913 (from 38% to 52%), and it had also risen sharply in 1861 (from 18.61% to 36.2%; +17.59%), between 1863 and 1866 (from 32.62% to 48.33%; +15.71%), and between 1920 and 1922 (from 16.4% to 38.1%; +21.7%) without producing global depressions.

Economic analysis of the Tariff Act
The years 1920 to 1929 are widely described, incorrectly, as years in which protectionism gained ground in Europe. In fact, from a general point of view, according to Paul Bairoch, the period before the crisis in Europe can be considered to have been preceded by trade liberalization. The weighted average of tariffs applied to manufactured products remained practically the same as in the years before the First World War: 24.6% in 1913, compared to 24.9% in 1927. In addition, in 1928 and 1929 , tariffs were reduced in almost all developed countries. Additionally, the Smoot–Hawley Tariff Act was signed by Hoover on June 17, 1930, while the Wall Street Crash occurred in the fall of 1929.

Paul Krugman writes that protectionism does not lead to recessions. According to him, the decrease in imports (which can be obtained by introducing tariffs) has an expansive effect, that is, it is favorable to growth. Thus, in a trade war, since exports and imports will decrease equally, for everyone, the negative effect of a decrease in exports will be offset by the expansionary effect of a decrease in imports. Therefore, a trade war does not cause a recession. Furthermore, he points out that the Smoot-Hawley tariff did not cause the Great Depression. The decline in trade between 1929 and 1933 "was almost entirely a consequence of the Depression, not a cause. Trade barriers were a response to the Depression, partly as a consequence of deflation."

Jacques Sapir explains that the crisis has other causes than protectionism. He points out that "domestic production in major industrialized countries is declining...faster than international trade is declining." If this decrease (in international trade) had been the cause of the depression that the countries have experienced, we would have seen the opposite". "Finally, the chronology of events does not correspond to the thesis of the free traders... The bulk of the contraction of trade occurred between January 1930 and July 1932, that is, before the introduction of protectionist measures, even self-sufficient, in some countries, with the exception of those applied in the United States in the summer of 1930, but with negative effects. very limited. He noted that "the credit crunch is one of the main causes of the trade crunch." "In fact, international liquidity is the cause of the trade contraction. This liquidity collapsed in 1930 (-35.7%) and 1931 (-26.7%). A study by the National Bureau of Economic Research  highlights the predominant influence of currency instability (which led to the international liquidity crisis) and the sudden rise in transportation costs in the decline of trade during the 1930s.

Milton Friedman was also of the opinion that the 1930 Smoot-Hawley Tariff did not cause the Great Depression. Douglas A. Irwin writes: "Most economists, liberal and conservative alike, doubt that Smoot Hawley had much to do with the subsequent contraction."
William J. Bernstein wrote: 

Peter Temin explains that a tariff is an expansive policy, like a devaluation, since it diverts demand from foreign to domestic producers. He points out that exports represented 7% of the GNP in 1929, fell by 1.5% of the GNP of 1929 in the following two years and the fall was offset by the increase in domestic demand due to tariffs. He concludes that, contrary to popular argument, the contractionary effect of the tariff was small.

After enactment
At first, the tariff seemed to be a success. According to historian Robert Sobel, "Factory payrolls, construction contracts, and industrial production all increased sharply." However, larger economic problems loomed in the guise of weak banks. When the Creditanstalt of Austria failed in 1931, the global deficiencies of the Smoot–Hawley Tariff became apparent.

US imports decreased 66% from $4.4 billion (1929) to $1.5 billion (1933), and exports decreased 61% from $5.4 billion to $2.1 billion. GNP fell from $103.1 billion in 1929 to $75.8 billion in 1931 and bottomed out at $55.6 billion in 1933. Imports from Europe decreased from a 1929 high of $1.3 billion to just $390 million during 1932, and US exports to Europe decreased from $2.3 billion in 1929 to $784 million in 1932. Overall, world trade decreased by some 66% between 1929 and 1934.

Using panel data estimates of export and import equations for 17 countries, Jakob B. Madsen (2002) estimated the effects of increasing tariff and non-tariff trade barriers on worldwide trade from 1929 to 1932. He concluded that real international trade contracted somewhere around 33% overall. His estimates of the impact of various factors included about 14% because of declining GNP in each country, 8% because of increases in tariff rates, 5% because of deflation-induced tariff increases, and 6% because of the imposition of non-tariff barriers.

The new tariff imposed an effective tax rate of 60% on more than 3,200 products and materials imported into the United States, quadrupling previous tariff rates on individual items but raising the average tariff rate to 19.2%, which was in line with average rates of that day.

Unemployment was 8% in 1930 when the Smoot–Hawley Act was passed, but the new law failed to lower it. The rate jumped to 16% in 1931 and 25% in 1932–1933. There is some contention about whether this can necessarily be attributed to the tariff, however.

It was only during World War II, when "the American economy expanded at an unprecedented rate", that unemployment fell below 1930s levels.

Imports during 1929 were only 4.2% of the US GNP, and exports were only 5.0%. Monetarists, such as Milton Friedman, who emphasized the central role of the money supply in causing the depression, considered the Smoot–Hawley Act to be only a minor cause for the US Great Depression.

End of tariffs
The 1932 Democratic campaign platform pledged to lower tariffs. After winning the election, President Franklin Delano Roosevelt and the now-Democratic Congress passed Reciprocal Trade Agreements Act of 1934. This act allowed the President to negotiate tariff reductions on a bilateral basis and treated such a tariff agreement as regular legislation, requiring a majority, rather than as a treaty requiring a two-thirds vote. This was one of the core components of the trade negotiating framework that developed after World War II. The tit-for-tat responses of other countries were understood to have contributed to a sharp reduction of trade in the 1930s.

After World War II, that understanding supported a push towards multilateral trading agreements that would prevent similar situations in the future. While the Bretton Woods Agreement of 1944 focused on foreign exchange and did not directly address tariffs, those involved wanted a similar framework for international trade. President Harry S. Truman launched this process in November 1945 with negotiations for the creation of a proposed International Trade Organization (ITO).

As it happened, separate negotiations on the General Agreement on Tariffs and Trade (GATT) moved more quickly, with an agreement signed in October 1947; in the end, the United States never signed the ITO agreement. Adding a multilateral "most-favored-nation" component to that of reciprocity, the GATT served as a framework for the gradual reduction of tariffs over the subsequent half century.

Postwar changes to the Smoot–Hawley tariffs reflected a general tendency of the United States to reduce its tariff levels unilaterally while its trading partners retained their high levels. The American Tariff League Study of 1951 compared the free and dutiable tariff rates of 43 countries. It found that only seven nations had a lower tariff level than the United States (5.1%), and eleven nations had free and dutiable tariff rates higher than the Smoot–Hawley peak of 19.8% including the United Kingdom (25.6%). The 43-country average was 14.4%, which was 0.9% higher than the U.S. level of 1929, demonstrating that few nations were reciprocating in reducing their levels as the United States reduced its own.

In modern political dialogue
In the discussion leading up to the passage of the North American Free Trade Agreement (NAFTA) then-Vice President Al Gore mentioned the Smoot–Hawley Tariff as a response to NAFTA objections voiced by Ross Perot during a debate in 1993 they had on The Larry King Show. He gave Perot a framed picture of Smoot and Hawley shaking hands after its passage.

In April 2009, then-Representative Michele Bachmann made news when, during a speech, she referred to the Smoot–Hawley Tariff as "the Hoot–Smalley Act", misattributed its signing to Franklin Roosevelt, and blamed it for the Great Depression.

The act has been compared to the 2010 Foreign Account Tax Compliance Act (FATCA), with Andrew Quinlan from the Center for Freedom and Prosperity calling FATCA "the worst economic idea to come out of Congress since Smoot–Hawley".

Forced labor
Prior to 2016, the Tariff Act provided that "[a]ll goods, wares, articles, and merchandise mined, produced, or manufactured wholly or in part in any foreign country by convict labor or/and forced labor or/and indentured labor under penal sanctions shall not be entitled to entry at any of the ports of the United States" with a specific exception known as the "consumptive demand exception", which allowed forced labor-based imports of goods where United States domestic production was not sufficient to meet consumer demand. The exception was removed under Wisconsin Representative Ron Kind's amendment bill, which was incorporated into the Trade Facilitation and Trade Enforcement Act of 2015, signed by President Barack Obama on February 24, 2016.

See also
 Country-of-origin labeling
 International trade
 Plant Patent Act of 1930 (originally enacted as Title III of the Smoot–Hawley Tariff Act)
 Trade war

References

Heavily featured in the book "Dave Barry Slept Here: a sort of history of the United States" by Dave Barry.

Sources

 
 
 
 
 
  Previously published as 
 
 
 
 
 
 
 
 Mitchener, Kris James, Kirsten Wandschneider, and Kevin Hjortshøj O'Rourke. "The Smoot–Hawley Trade War" (No. w28616. National Bureau of Economic Research, 2021) online.
 
 
  – Classic study of passage of Hawley–Smoot Tariff
 
 
 

1930 in American law
Great Depression in the United States
United States federal taxation legislation
United States federal trade legislation
1930 in international relations
June 1930 events
1930 in economics